The Women’s 200 metre individual medley at the 2014 IPC Swimming European Championships was held at the Pieter van den Hoogenband Swimming Stadium, in Eindhoven from 4–10 August.

Medalists

See also
List of IPC world records in swimming

References

individual medley 200 m women
2014 in women's swimming